The Cleveland metropolitan area is the metropolitan area encompassing Cleveland, Ohio, United States.

The Cleveland metropolitan area may also refer to:
The Cleveland metropolitan area, Tennessee, United States
The Cleveland micropolitan area, Mississippi, United States

See also
Cleveland (disambiguation)